"I Want You" is the first single from Jody Watley's third album Affairs of the Heart. The official music video, directed by Andy Morahan, was featured on an episode of Beverly Hills, 90210.

Charts

References

1991 songs
1991 singles
Dance-pop songs
Jody Watley songs
MCA Records singles
Music videos directed by Andy Morahan
Song recordings produced by André Cymone
Songs written by André Cymone
Songs written by Jody Watley